Pasapalabra is a Spanish television game show, adapted from the British format The Alphabet Game. The title is a portmanteau of the Spanish verb pasar, "pass", and palabra, literally "word".

Gameplay
In each episode, two contestants team with celebrities (usually, one male and one female celebrity per team) to play various games.

All of them begin with the female celebrity, who sits to the contestant's right.

 One of Four

In this round, players are given four options to choose from, then asked a series of questions, usually built around a theme (e.g. musicians, actors, countries, animals, etc.). A correct answer scores two seconds and removes that option from the board, which is then replaced by a new one; therefore, there are always four options for each question. An incorrect answer removes the correct one from the board and play passes to the next player on the team; players cannot pass without a guess. The players must answer as many questions as they can in 75 seconds.

 Music Round

Players go head-to-head against their opposite on the other team to identify a popular song; the two female celebrity guests go first, followed by the two contestants, and finally the two male celebrity guests. The host reveals the year in which the song was first released (though in some cases, they listen to a cover version, in which case the host will tell them the year in which the cover was released); a short snippet of the song is then played, and if the player can identify it correctly, they earn the contestant five seconds. A player may buzz in at any time after the music begins, and buzzing in does not stop the music; therefore, players will usually try to buzz in immediately when the music starts (though buzzing in too soon, before the music actually starts, results in a lost turn).

If neither player can guess the song, the host then reads a line from the lyrics (which are usually in Spanish or English, though occasionally in Italian or French); identifying the song from this earns four seconds. If not, another snippet is played, worth three seconds. 

For two seconds, several options are possible: either the host reads the title with the words out of order; conveys the title using synonyms for the actual words; or, if the title is in a language other than Spanish, reads a translation of the title into Spanish, which the players must translate correctly.

If the players still do not know the song, a final snippet of music is played, worth one second; if neither knows by the end of this round, no seconds are scored, and play advances to the next pair.

The songs are generally popular songs from music history, though sometimes they are themes from film or TV series, or children's songs. In these cases, this fact is revealed at the beginning, rather than the year of the song.

 Word search

Players are presented with a five-by-five grid of letters and given a theme; they must then find three words related to that theme within the grid. The words to find range from two to five letters in length. For every complete grid, contestants earn five seconds.

An incorrect answer passes to the next player (or, if the player voluntarily passes). After five passes and/or incorrect answers, the grid is revealed and a new one replaces it. There are a maximum of eight grids per round, so a contestant can earn up to 40 seconds, making this potentially the most valuable round in the game.

 Where are they?

Players are shown a grid of nine words, all revolving around a theme. They are only shown the words for a few seconds and must try to remember as many as possible, before the grid is replaced by numbers. The clock then starts at 75 seconds, and the host reads the words on the grid in random order; players must state which number the word is behind. Correct answers reveal the word and the host reads the next; incorrect answers reset the grid and the words are hidden again.

If a player correctly finds all nine words in a single play, the contestant locks in 10 seconds. If both teams find all the words on their respective grids, each contestant earns 10 seconds; if only one team does so, that contestant earns 20 seconds. If neither team finds all nine words, the team who found the most earns 5 seconds; if there is a tie, each earns 5 seconds.

 Final round

Play proceeds through letters of the Spanish alphabet, except K and W: for each letter, the host reads a definition of a word starting with it (or, in the case of Ñ, Q, X, and Y, containing the letter). A contestant responds with a word, or passes by saying "". After a pass or an incorrect answer, play moves to the other contestant; each player's  contains one answer on which the host elaborates, usually with a brief explanation of the word's etymology.

Once a player has heard all the definitions, they usually immediately pass to skip letters they have not answered to avoid losing time while they try to think of an answer (though no matter how fast they pass, one second is always deducted per turn). If a player wishes, they can say nothing and let their time run out.

If a player does not win the jackpot, they win €1,200 if they answer more correct than their opponent, or if each has the same number correct but their opponent has more incorrect responses; for example, if Player A has answered 22 correct and has no incorrect answers, while Player B also has 22 correct but one incorrect, Player A would be the winner.

In the event of a tie, each player wins €600. Therefore, a player can come away with a sum of money from their time on the show, even if they never win the jackpot.

History
Pasapalabra first aired on Antena 3 in 2000, with Silvia Jato as host. Constantino Romero substituted Jato in 2002. Jaime Cantizano replaced Jato as host in 2006.

In 2006, a Pasapalabra jackpot of €2,190,000 became the largest prize ever awarded on a game show in Spain, and the third largest prize ever awarded on a game show in Europe.

In 2007, Pasapalabra moved to Telecinco with Christian Gálvez as host. Pasapalabra aired evenings on Telecinco, Monday through Friday.

In 2014, Lilit Manukyan of Armenia became the first Pasapalabra jackpot winner whose native language was not Spanish.

On 2 October 2019, the programme was pulled by Telecinco, following a ruling by the Supreme Court of Spain in favour of ITV Studios in a royalty dispute over the rights to the Pasapalabra format. While initially adapted from the British panel game show The Alphabet Game, Mediaset argued that the format had evolved substantially to include elements (such as the endgame) that were not included in the original format, to the point that it believed ITV were no longer entitled to royalties. However, the court ruled otherwise. Telecinco briefly replaced the programme with its own original format, El tirón, which was also hosted by Gálvez.

On 19 December 2019, Antena 3 announced that it would revive Pasapalabra. Roberto Leal took on hosting duties, with Manel Fuentes filling in for him for two episodes while he was quarantined after contracting COVID-19.

On 28 February 2021, a special 20th anniversary episode aired with former hosts Silvia Jato and Jaime Cantizano as guest contestants.

On 1 July 2021, Pablo Díaz won a jackpot of nearly €2,000,000, after a record run of 260 consecutive episodes.

List of El Rosco winners

References

External links
  (Antena 3)
  (Telecinco)

2000 Spanish television series debuts
Antena 3 (Spanish TV channel) original programming
Telecinco original programming
Spanish game shows
Spanish television series based on British television series